Infected is an American science-fiction action-horror film directed by Glenn Ciano.

Plot

A father and his son must fight to survive against a deadly, rapidly spreading blood virus that has infected a group of hunters.

Cast
 Michael Madsen as Louis
 Christy Carlson Romano as Kelly
 William Forsythe as Dr. Ed Dennehey
 Michael Nicolosi as Matt
 Myke Michaels	as Infected In Window
 Johnny Cicco as Seth
 Lily Haze as Infected Woman
 Eric Norris as Infected Man
 Tom DeNucci as Andrew
 J. J. Perry as Infected Man
 Kristi Lynn as Infected Woman
 Manny Perry as Infected Man
 Brian Smrz as Infected Man
 Taylor Momsen as Sarah
 Bug Hall as Tom
 Kathryn E. Prescott as Infected Horde
 Tom Paolino as Infected Father
 Nicholas John Bilotta	as Infected Man #1
 Sera Verdi as Sarah
 Wendy Overly as Annie O'Toole
 Annie Worden as Jessica
 Chad A. Verdi Jr. as Infected Son
 Jared Hartley	as Infected Man #2
 Jeanine Kane as Angela
 Tracey Sheldon as Hooker
 Furio Spagliatelli as Infected Man #3
 Brian Steven Burke as Infected Mayor
 Jade Hartley as Infected Horde
 Charles James Wesley as Infected Attacker
 Kevin DeCristofano as Jeremy Dennehey
 Gary Roscoe as Infected 
 George J. Vezina as Bald Infected With Beard
 Robert A Glenn as Infected Man In Business

Production
Ciano began with the filming of the Horror-Action film in October 2010. Michael Madsen, Christy Carlson Romano and William Forsythe were cast as the leads of the film. The Woodhaven Production Company produced the film. Glenn Ciano co-wrote the script with Robert Rotondo Jr., but the story was originally an idea of Ciano's. The film was produced by director Glenn Ciano. It was filmed on location in Foster, Rhode Island.

Release
The original release was set for the late 2010. The film premiered at Worcester’s 2012 Rock and Shock Convention and was released onto DVD on April 9, 2013.

References

External links
 
 

2012 films
American horror films
Films about viral outbreaks
2012 horror films
2010s English-language films
2010s American films